Kirkebygda is the administrative centre of Enebakk municipality, Norway. Its population was reported as 1,448.

References 

Villages in Akershus
Enebakk